Statistics of Kuwaiti Premier League for the 2002–03 season.

Overview
It was contested by 8 teams, and Al Qadisiya Kuwait won the championship.

League standings

Top scorers

References
Kuwait - List of final tables (RSSSF)

2002–03
1
2002–03 in Asian association football leagues